The 2016 Firestone Grand Prix of St. Petersburg was the first round of the 2016 IndyCar Series. The race was held on March 13, 2016 in St. Petersburg, Florida on the city's temporary street circuit. Team Penske driver Will Power qualified on pole for the race, but was diagnosed with a concussion shortly after the conclusion of the session and was forced to miss the race. Oriol Servià filled in place of Power. Second place qualifier Simon Pagenaud inherited the pole position.

Simon Pagenaud led the opening 48 laps of the race before being passed by his teammate Juan Pablo Montoya. Montoya would lead 44 laps en route to his second win in a row at St. Petersburg and most recent IndyCar victory to date. Rookie driver Conor Daly also led 15 laps during the race due to pit strategy, but was shuffled outside the top 10 by the end of the race. Alexander Rossi was the highest finishing rookie in the race, coming across the line in 12th position. The race tied the record for fewest caution flags in a race at St. Petersburg with only two coming out over the whole of the race. The first came on lap 46 when Luca Filippi and Marco Andretti made contact in the first turn. The second came on the restart from the prior caution when Carlos Muñoz made contact with Graham Rahal in turn four, creating a logjam that completely blocked the race course.

After the race, Will Power was reevaluated and deemed not to have a concussion, but instead to be suffering from a lingering ear infection. Power would be cleared to race for the following round at Phoenix International Raceway.

Report

Qualifying

Source for Individual Rounds:

Race Results

Notes
 Points include 1 point for leading at least 1 lap during a race, an additional 2 points for leading the most race laps, and 1 point for Pole Position.

Source for time gaps:

Championship standings after the race

Drivers' Championship standings

 Note: Only the top five positions are included.

References

External links
 Official Pit Stop Data
 Official Race Broadcast

Firestone Grand Prix of St. Petersburg
Grand Prix of St. Petersburg
Grand Prix of St. Petersburg
21st century in St. Petersburg, Florida
Firestone Grand Prix of St. Petersburg